Harold Katz (born May 5, 1937) is an American entrepreneur from the Greater Philadelphia area.

He bought the Philadelphia 76ers of the National Basketball Association from Fitz Eugene Dixon Jr. in July 1981.  During his ownership, he brought the 76ers to their most recent NBA Championship win in the 1982-1983 season.  He sold the team to Comcast Spectacor in April 1996. Katz is also the founder and former owner of Nutrisystem, Inc. and founder of the private equity firm H. Katz Capital Group.

References

National Basketball Association executives
Philadelphia 76ers owners
Living people
1937 births